The Zero Years is a 2005 Greek dramatic experimental independent underground art film directed by Nikos Nikolaidis, his final film.

Plot
A tale of perversion and sexual dominance set in a dystopia, the film is about four female prostitutes, all of whom were sterilized, engaging in sadomasochism.

Cast
Vicky Harris as Prostitute Vicky
Jenny Kitselli as Leader
Arhontisa Mavrakaki as Maro
Eftyhia Yakoumi as Christina
Michele Valley	as Supervisor
Alkis Panagiotidis
Yiorgos Mihalakis
Maria Margeti
Nikos Moustakas
Angeliki Aristomenopoulou
Dorothea Iatrou
Anastasia Iatrou
Nefeli Efstathiadi
Christos Houliaras
Themis Katz
Natasa Kapsabeli

Reception

Accolades
The film's art director, Marie-Louise Bartholomew, won the Best Production Designer Award at the Thessaloniki International Film Festival's Greek State Film Awards in November 2005. In addition, the film was officially selected for screening at the Chicago International Film Festival in October 2005 and in October 2006 where, during both times, it was nominated for the Gold Hugo.

Professor Vrasidas Karalis, an expert on Greek cinema and the author of A History of Greek Cinema, described in this book the film as "highly personal" and "hermetic." Derek Elley of Variety argued that the film, despite "excesses," has a "strain of irony" that remains constant and that it has an "off-center, ironic flavor." Karalis argued that it was derivative of Nikolaidis' earlier films and that it "confirmed the fossilization of a visual style which had transformed itself into a self-conscious manneristic extravaganza."

Karalis compared the film to Luis Buñuel's 1967 Belle de Jour and Pier Paolo Pasolini's 1975 Salò, or the 120 Days of Sodom. In November 2005, after the film's completion, due to the fact that it failed to replicate the earlier success of Singapore Sling (1990), Nikolaidis declared his intention to stop making movies in order to deal with music.

One Italian critic had the following to say about this film:

References

External links
The Zero Years at Nikos Nikolaidis (Film Director/Writer/Producer)

The Zero Years at 5 Books, 6 Films, and... Nikos Nikolaidis: Films

The Zero Years at The New York Times Movies

2000s Greek-language films
2000s avant-garde and experimental films
2000s business films
2005 films
2005 drama films
2005 independent films
Greek avant-garde and experimental films
Greek drama films
Dystopian films
Films about death
Films about missing people
Films about prostitution in Greece
Films about security and surveillance
Films about slavery
Films about totalitarianism
BDSM in films
Films directed by Nikos Nikolaidis
Films set in Greece
Films set in prison
Films shot in Greece
Medical-themed films
Sterilization in fiction